Remix Fuel  was developed in Russia to make use of Mixed Recycled Uranium and Plutonium from spent nuclear fuel to manufacture fresh fuel suitable for widespread use in Russian reactor designs.

Compared to "conventional" MOX-fuel
MOX or Mixed Oxide Fuel as deployed in some western European and East Asian nations generally consists of depleted Uranium mixed with between 4% and 7% reactor grade plutonium. Only a few Generation II and about half of Generation III reactor designs are MOX fuel compliant allowing them to use a 100% MOX fuel load with no safety concerns.

Nuclear physics background
However all moderated reactors using lightly enriched Uranium fuel produce Plutonium in the course of normal operation as Uranium-238 (typically 94% to 97% of the uranium content in lightly enriched uranium) captures neutrons and undergoes successive beta decays until it is transmuted to plutonium-239. This internally produced Plutonium increases in percentage until it is common enough that a growing percentage of Fission reactions within the fuel are actually within the Plutonium generated during the fuel cycle. Approximately half of the Plutonium-239 "bred" during the fuel cycle is fissioned and another 25% is transmuted through additional neutron capture into other Plutonium isotopes, primarily Pu-240. Virtually all of the minor actinides present in spent nuclear fuel are produced by successive neutron capture of the Plutonium produced and as decay products of the more short lived isotopes. As a consequence of these factors the fresh Uranium Oxide fuel initially generates all of its fission reactions from U-235 but at the end of the cycle this has shifted to 50% U-235/50% Pu-239 fission reactions. In total about 33% of the energy generated by Uranium fuel at the end of its life cycle actually comes from the bred and consumed Pu-239. Because the thermal neutron spectrum is not very good for fissioning Pu-239 the fuel shifts from 100% Uranium at start of cycle to 96% Uranium, 1% Plutonium and 3% mixture of transuranic minor actinides and fission products. The longer the fuel remains in the reactor undergoing fission the more the Uranium percentage decreases while the other materials increase. In effect all power reactors have been long known to be capable of operating with a mixed fissionable core containing 1% reactor grade Plutonium without issues arising like those caused by the more highly concentrated MOX fuel used in western reactors.   Ultimately, the spent fuel is removed from power reactors long before all available "fuel" is actually consumed, as neutron poisons and minor actinides with undesirable properties build up to unacceptable levels and alter the reaction parameters too much. Nuclear reprocessing is primarily done to remove undesirable parts of the spent fuel and either re-use the other parts or store them as waste. Reprocessed uranium for example, which is derived from spent fuel, usually has a higher Uranium-235 content than natural uranium.

Process
Russia spent nearly a decade developing techniques similar to Nuclear Pyroprocessing that allows them to reprocess spent nuclear fuel without separating the recycled Uranium and Plutonium from the other metals as is done in the PUREX chemical reprocessing system used to manufacture MOX fuel. The Recovered Mixture of Uranium and Reactor Grade Plutonium is then converted to Oxide and blended with medium enriched fresh Uranium Oxide fuel in a carefully measured proportion to create a mixture with 4% U-235 and 1% Reactor Grade Plutonium. After extensive testing in a reactor starting in 2016  Russia is now deploying Remix Fuel as replacement fuel for their VVER Pressurized Water Reactors as of February 2020.

References

Fuels
Fuel production
Nuclear reprocessing